Skålvær are a group of islands in the municipality of Alstahaug in Nordland county, Norway. The islands were formerly a part of Vega Municipality, but in 1971 it was transferred to Alstahaug.

Skålvær was once a thriving trading post and had many residents, but it has since declined in importance.  Today, much of Skålvær is an outdoor recreation area for Alstahaug municipality. In addition, there are about fifteen private houses and cottages scattered around the main island.  Since 2007, there are no longer any permanent residents on Skålvær, but the place is far from abandoned.  Summer residents live on the island, and Skålvær Church holds services on the island infrequently.

See also
List of islands of Norway

References

Alstahaug
Islands of Nordland
Uninhabited islands of Norway